Columba of Rieti, (2 February 1467 – 20 May 1501) was an Italian religious sister of the Third Order of St. Dominic who was noted as a mystic. She was renowned for her spiritual counsel, devotion to the Blessed Sacrament, and fantastic miracles were attributed to her. She was beatified by the Catholic Church in 1625.

Life

Early life 
Columba was born Angelella Guardagnoli, the daughter of a poor family in the Umbrian city of Rieti. Legend states that when she was born, angels gathered around her house, singing, and that during her baptism, a dove flew down to the font. From then on, no one referred to her as Angelella, but as Columba (dove). As a small girl, Columba learned to spin and sew repairing the clothes of the local Dominican friars. She was educated by Dominican nuns. As a teenager, she prayed to discern her vocation in life and received a vision of Christ on a throne surrounded by saints. She took this as a sign to dedicate herself to God, and so she made a private vow of chastity, and spent her time in prayer. When it was revealed that her parents had arranged a marriage for her, she cut off her hair and sent it to her suitor as a way of letting him know where her real interest lay.

Eating disorder 
Columba fasted regularly, a form of religiously-motivated self-starvation or abstaining from food.  Anorexia mirabilis was well known in Columba's time, when it was not seen as a medical emergency or mental illness as it would be today, instead revered as a symbol of one's piety. Ultimately, the disease caused her death in 1501, at the age of 34. Additionally, Columba was known to engage in acts designed to cause her physical pain, such as at the wearing of a hairshirt and sleeping on thorns. It's possible that she may have been influenced by Catherine of Siena, an earlier Italian Dominican saint, who suffered from anorexia mirabilis and died at the age of 33. Also, like Catherine, Columba cut her hair short to avoid marriage.

Religious career 
Columba became a Dominican tertiary at age 19. She was reputedly given to ecstasies, during one of which her spirit toured the Holy Land. She was much sought after as a spiritual counselor. It is said that citizens from the city of Narni tried to kidnap her so she could be their miracle worker, but she escaped. The same townsfolk were later to fight to retain their own townswoman and mystic, Lucy of Narni.

Upon an interior prompting that she should leave Rieti, Columba wandered away, having no concept of where she was going. Along the way she was arrested in Foligno as a vagrant. The bishop there ordered her to go to Perugia and to found a Third Order convent, which she did, but only against the strong objections of the citizens of Foligno and Rieti who wanted her for their own towns. She worked with the poor extensively in Perugia, so much so that her sanctity reportedly incensed Lucrezia Borgia for years. At one point Borgia had even issued a complaint accusing Columba of practicing magic. On the other hand, Pope Alexander VI, Lucrezia's father, held Columba in high regard. He consulted her and received a severe admonition to repent from her.

Columba spent eleven years as prioress in Perugia, dying on 20 May 1501, at the age of 34. Legend says that at the moment of her death, her friend and fellow Dominican tertiary, Osanna of Mantua, saw Columba's soul as a "radiance rising to heaven." The whole city turned out for her funeral, which was paid for by the city fathers.

She was beatified on 25 February 1625 by Pope Urban VIII, and her feast day is celebrated within the Dominican Order on the anniversary of her death.

Notes and references
References

Works cited

See also
Blessed Stephana de Quinzanis
Blessed Osanna of Mantua

External links

1467 births
1501 deaths
People from Rieti
Dominican Sisters
15th-century Italian Roman Catholic religious sisters and nuns
Dominican mystics
Dominican beatified people
Miracle workers
Burials in Umbria
15th-century venerated Christians
16th-century venerated Christians
15th-century Christian mystics
16th-century Christian mystics
Visions of Jesus and Mary